Ripiphorus fasciatus is a species of wedge-shaped beetle with parasitoid larvae. R. fasciatus likely parasitizes Halictid bees; all Ripiphorus parasitize ground-nesting bees.

Description
R. fasciatus has clear hindwings, plumose antenna, and superficially resembles a bee or fly.

Range
This species has been documented in the northeastern United States and Eastern Canada.

References

Ripiphoridae
Beetles of North America